The Ikhemu-sek ( – literally "the ones not knowing destruction" also known as the Imperishable ones) were a group of ancient Egyptian minor deities who where the personifications of the northern constellations.

History 

The northern constellations were depicted in the tomb of Senenmut on the astronomical ceiling. The Ikhemu-sek were also found on the astronomical vaulted ceilings of tombs in the Valley of the Kings.

Iconography 
The Ikhemu-sek where portrayed as both animal and human-like: A woman, lion (leo), bull, man, falcon-headed man, man, and hippopotamus.

See also 
 Sopdet
 Sah
 Astrotheology
 The Indestructibles
 Nut
 Mehet-Weret

References 

Groups of Egyptian deities